Versions of Me is the fifth studio and second multilingual album by Brazilian singer Anitta, released on April 12, 2022, through Warner Records. Ryan Tedder executive produced the album. The singles "Me Gusta" (featuring Cardi B and Myke Towers), "Girl from Rio", "Faking Love" (featuring Saweetie), "Envolver", and "Boys Don't Cry" preceded the album.

Versions of Me received generally positive reviews from music critics, who praised its production. The album broke records in Spotify, opening with over six million streams and thus becoming the biggest debut of a Brazilian artist on the platform. The album also holds the record of biggest streaming week for a Brazilian artist in Spotify, with over 39 million streams. By May 2022, the album had earned 111.7 million on-demand song streams in the United States. In October 2022, Versions of Me became the first Brazilian pop album to hit 1 billion streams on Spotify.

Background
After releasing her trilingual visual album Kisses (2019), Anitta started working on her fifth studio album, which was originally titled Girl from Rio. In a 2020 interview for the Brazilian magazine Veja, Anitta confirmed at that time that she had 30 songs ready for the album and was selecting the tracklist with her manager Brandon Silverstein. In April 2021, Anitta released the single "Girl from Rio", which was announced as the then-title track of the album, but Anitta and her team decided to hold off on releasing the album that year.

Anitta announced the album's changed title, release date and cover art on April 1, 2022, also saying that she would subsequently explain her thinking behind the album cover and that she "loved" that it was "causing controversy", stating that was her intent. She later released a statement on her social media accounts that read in part, "Even after millions of plastic surgeries, doctors and interventions... my inside just stays the same", which references the "notable plastic surgery differences" between the different faces on the cover. She also remarked that the title was changed to Versions of Me as it "made more sense".

In July 2022, Anitta confirmed the release of a deluxe edition of the album featuring collaborations with Maluma, "El Que Espera", and Missy Elliot, "Lobby". Both songs will have music videos and she also confirmed a music video for "Gata". "Gata" was then confirmed as the first single from the deluxe edition of the album released on August 5, 2022.

Promotion
To promote the single "Girl from Rio", Anitta performed on several American talk shows in May 2021, including The Tonight Show Starring Jimmy Fallon, Today and Jimmy Kimmel Live!. On September 12, 2021, she performed the song during the 2021 MTV Video Music Awards break, as part of a campaign by Burger King. She performed on The Tonight Show again on January 31, 2022, singing "Boys Don't Cry".

"Faking Love" was performed on the American talk show The Late Late Show with James Corden, where she sang the song with the rapper Saweetie in November 2021. The single was performed in various other events throughout that year, including Miley's New Year's Eve Party, KIIS-FM Jingle Ball 2021, among others.

On March 26, 2022, Anitta sang "Boys Don't Cry" with Miley Cyrus during the singer's show on the 2022 edition of Lollapalooza Brazil.

A brazilian funk remix of song "Practice" was performed by Anitta on Savage X Fenty Show. A simlish version of it was released for The Sims game.

Singles
"Me Gusta" featuring Cardi B and Myke Towers, was released on September 18, 2020, as the official lead single from the album. In the United States, the song debuted at number 91 on the Billboard Hot 100 dated October 3, 2020, becoming Anitta's first entry on the chart.

"Girl from Rio" was released as the second single on April 29, 2021. It was released as the original title track before the concept of the album changed. A remix was released featuring DaBaby was released on June 11, 2021. Anitta then released her next English track, "Faking Love" featuring Saweetie, as the third single on October 14, 2021.

"Envolver" was released as the fourth single on November 11, 2021. The single managed to become one of Anitta's most successful singles to date and was her second Billboard Hot 100 entry reaching number 70 following a viral TikTok trend in March 2022. A remix featuring Justin Quiles was released on February 17, 2022. "Boys Don't Cry" was then released as the fifth single on January 27, 2022.

On June 23, 2022, "Dançarina Remix" was released as a promotional single, later added to the deluxe edition of the album, with a music video and features Pedro Sampaio, Dadju, Nicky Jam and MC Pedrinho.

On August 4, 2022, Anitta announced "Gata" as the seventh single with its music video released the following day.

"El Que Espera" with Maluma was released on August 11, 2022, and "Lobby" with Missy Elliot was released the week after. Both are included on the deluxe edition of Versions of Me, released on August 25 with five additional songs and a different cover.

Composition
Versions of Me is a reggaetón and power pop album with elements of electropop, EDM, alternative R&B, funk carioca, electro, and trap-pop.

Critical reception

Versions of Me received generally positive reviews from critics. On review aggregator Album of the Year, the album has a rating of 77 out of 100 based on 3 reviews.

Reviewing positively for NME, Nick Levine called the album "a searingly ambitious affair from a star who knows exactly what she wants", scoring it four out of five stars. In another positive review for Forbes, Chis Méndez affirmed Anitta "shows that she's more than just a pretty face—one that she's proud of after "hundreds" of cosmetic procedures. She easily hops between English, Spanish, and Portuguese as she sings about love, lust, loss, and everything in between".

For Rolling Stone, Julissa Lopez stated that Anitta's search for an international market "worked, and it made Anitta one of the biggest stars in the Latin pop world. For her next act, she's ready to take on the rest of the planet, and she's planning to do so by sharing the most uncompromising portrait of herself on Versions of Me". Reviewing the album for Rolling Stone, Charles Aaron found it to be "a tirelessly bewitching global dance-floor experience", adding "some may harbor doubts [of Anitta's success], but Anitta has the talent – and data – she needs", rating it four out of five stars.

Billboard affirmed the record "proves Anitta's versatility and chameleonic abilities to dabble in multiple genres". Ana Claro Ribeiro for The Life of Best Fit, said "as [Anitta] dreams of becoming Brazilian funk's poster girl and pave the way for more Brazilian artists to have a global platform, Anitta knows damn well that the route to success requires a few concessions and adjustments, and she's very willing to make them", rating the album 7 out of 10.

In June 2022, Rolling Stone, ranked Versions of Me as one of the 58 best albums of 2022. The same month, Billboard ranked Versions of Me as one of the best 22 Latin albums of 2022.

Year-end lists

Awards and nominations

Track listing

Sample credits
 "Gata" samples "Guatauba" performed by Plan B.
 "Gimme Your Number" sample "La Bamba" performed by Ritchie Valens.
 "Girl from Rio" interpolates "Garota de Ipanema" performed by Vinicius de Moraes e Tom Jobim.

Notes 
The song "Boys Don't Cry" became a track on the deluxe edition of the album Attentions: Miley Live by Miley Cyrus after Anitta's participation in the performance of "Mother's Daughter" at Lollapalooza Brazil.

Charts

Certifications

Release history

References

2022 albums
Albums produced by Ryan Tedder
Anitta (singer) albums
Portuguese-language albums
Spanish-language albums
Warner Records albums
Power pop albums
Reggaeton albums